John Wilson Ross (November 1863 – June 30, 1945) was a justice of the Supreme Court of Arizona from November 13, 1918 to January 6, 1919. At 8 weeks, Ross served the shortest tenure in the court's history while his brother, Henry D. Ross, served the longest.

Ross was appointed by Governor George W. P. Hunt to replace outgoing Justice Alfred Franklin, who'd been defeated in the 1918 primary by Albert C. Baker.  Franklin resigned before the end of his term to take a position as Collector of Internal Revenue for the Arizona–New Mexico District.

Ross later served in the 9th Arizona State Legislature, representing Cochise County.

References

 Arizona Library Photo

Justices of the Arizona Supreme Court
1863 births
1945 deaths
People from Berryville, Arkansas
Democratic Party Arizona state senators